A constitutional referendum was held in Uruguay on 19 April 1934, alongside parliamentary elections. The new constitution was approved by 95.75% of voters.

Background
A series of conflicts between the National Council of Administration and President Gabriel Terra led to Terra leading a presidential coup on 31 March 1933. Terra instituted a government that suspended the 1918 constitution, and elections were held for a Constitutional Assembly on 25 June. The various factions of the Colorado Party emerged as the largest group in the Assembly, winning 151 of the 284 seats.

New constitution
The new constitution abolished the National Council of Administration and transferred its powers to the President, with President also becoming the head of government. Other changes included the Senate being equally divided between the two parties receiving the most votes, and allowing the public to propose constitutional amendments (though 20% of the electorate).

Results

See also
Uruguayan Constitution

References

1934 referendums
1934 in Uruguay
Referendums in Uruguay
Constitutional referendums in Uruguay
April 1934 events